Mario Maya (1937 – September 27, 2008) was one of Spain's most innovative and influential flamenco dancers. He was born in Córdoba in 1937 to a Romani family, but grew up in the Sacromonte of Granada. He set up his own school in Seville in 1983 and, ten years later, presented his new company ‘Flamenco Mario Maya’ at the Alcalá Palace Theatre in Madrid. Between 1994 and 1997 he directed the Andalusian Dance Company at the Andalusian Dance Centre. He took part in Carlos Saura’s Flamenco (film 1995). Some of his most important works include Ceremonial (1974), Camelamos Naquerar (1976), ¡Ay Jondo! (1977), El Amargo (1986), El Amor Brujo (1987) and Réquiem (1994). 

Maya died of cancer in Seville on September 27, 2008.

Awards 
  National Dance Award (1971)
 Juana la Macarrona Award (1977)
 Andalusian Silver Medal (1986)  
 National Dance Award (1992)
 Giraldillo (2008)

See also
 List of dancers

External links 
 Andalucia.org
 Spanish is Culture

References

Flamenco dancers
1937 births
2008 deaths
Spanish male dancers
Spanish choreographers
Deaths from cancer in Spain
Romani dancers
Spanish Romani people